Alber Gonsalves  is an Indian professional footballer.

Career
After scoring five goals in nine matches for SESA Football Academy in the Goa Professional League, Gonsalves was signed by I-League side Sporting Clube de Goa on 18 March 2015. He made his debut for the club on 31 March 2015 against Bengaluru FC. He started the match and 55 minutes as Sporting Goa were defeated 4–1. Gonsalves then scored his first professional goal for the club on 22 April 2015 against Mumbai. His 13th-minute goal was the first of the match as it ended 1–1.

International
Gonsalves was a part of the India team that took part in the 2014 Expo Unity World Cup.

Career statistics

Honour

Goa lusophony 
2014 Lusophony Games (1)

References

Living people

Indian footballers
SESA Football Academy players
Sporting Clube de Goa players
Association football midfielders

Goa Professional League players
I-League players
Year of birth missing (living people)
Place of birth missing (living people)
Footballers from Goa
ARA FC players